R v Glad Day Bookshops Inc, (2004) is a leading Ontario Superior Court of Justice decision on pornography and homosexuality. The court found that a statutory scheme requiring the approval of the Ontario Film Review Board before films can be distributed or shown in Ontario violated the guarantee of freedom of expression in section 2 of the Canadian Charter of Rights and Freedoms.

Background
Bad Attitude is a lesbian magazine featuring stories of mild sado-masochism; it is published in the United States.  In 1993 the magazine was the first publication to fall foul of feminist-inspired pornography laws in Canada.

According to the court's description, the magazine

 consists of a series of articles where the writers fantasize about lesbian sexual encounters with a sadomasochistic theme. Photographs loosely complement some of the articles.

A story in the magazine featuring a lesbian stalking, ambushing and pleasuring another woman was found to be obscene, and the Glad Day Bookshop, which sold the investigating officer her copy, was fined C$200.

Significance

The case was symbolic for pornography advocates, who at the time were trying to demonstrate that the arguments of anti-porn feminists Catharine MacKinnon and Andrea Dworkin were antithetical to women's interests. MacKinnon and Dworkin had provided arguments for new obscenity law in Canada; in this case the law disproportionately limited the voices of gay and lesbian writers, and even led to the impounding of two titles written by Dworkin.

See also
 List of notable Canadian lower court cases
 Anti-pornography movement

External links
Bad Attitude court decision
Statement by Catharine A. MacKinnon and Andrea Dworkin regarding Canadian customs and legal approaches to pornography
Bad Attitude
Court's decision

Canadian Charter of Rights and Freedoms case law
Canadian freedom of expression case law
Pornography case law
Canadian LGBT rights case law
2004 in LGBT history
2004 in Canadian case law
Canadian law articles needing infoboxes
Ontario case law
2004 in Ontario